Leila is an Indian Hindi-language dystopian drama web series directed by Deepa Mehta, Shanker Raman and Pawan Kumar. Based on the 2017 eponymous novel by Prayaag Akbar, Leila follows the story of Shalini, who tries to find her missing daughter in a totalitarian regime in the near future. Written by Urmi Juvekar, it stars Huma Qureshi, Siddharth, Rahul Khanna, Sanjay Suri and Arif Zakaria. A teaser was launched on 8 March. The six-episode series premiered on 14 June 2019 on Netflix.

Cast
Huma Qureshi as Shalini
Siddharth as Bhanu
Leysha Mange as Leila
Seema Biswas as Madhu
Rahul Khanna as Rizwan Chaudhary
Sanjay Suri as Joshiji
Arif Zakaria as Guru Ma
Ashwath Bhatt as Mr. Dixit
Indu Sharma as Mrs. Dixit
Pallavi Batra as Kanika
Anupam Bhattacharya as Mohan
Akash Khurana as Mr. Rao
Jagjeet Sandhu as Rakesh
Prasanna Soni as Ashish
Neha Mahajan as Pooja
Adarsh Gourav as Naz Chaudhary

Production
In February 2018, Netflix announced that an original series will be made on the dystopian fiction novel Leila by Prayaag Akbar, with Urmi Juvekar serving as the writer and executive producer. In November, it was announced that Deepa Mehta along with Pawan Kumar and Shanker Raman, will be directing the series. To prepare for the role of Shalini, Qureshi went through physical training. The principal photography of Leila began in October 2018 in Delhi. It was finished in February 2019.

Episodes

Season 1

Reception 

Rohan Naahar of Hindustan Times gave the show a 4/5 and said of it "What the show cannot achieve in terms of streamlined storytelling, it more than makes up for with the sheer audacity of its ideas, and for having the bravery of following through on them." He also said that the show's YouTube trailer was dislike bombed by individuals calling the show "Hinduphobic".

Soumya Rao of Scroll.in said that "In [the] Netflix series, the future isn’t very different from the present" and elaborated that "Although Leila is set in the distant future, there are unmistakable allusions to the present. Dissenters are branded as traitors, intellectuals are attacked and the Repeaters have unchecked powers."

Hiba Bég of The Quint rated the show a 4/5 and said "‘Leila’ Is a Show That Will Force You to Re-Think Everything".

References

External links

Hindi-language Netflix original programming
2019 Indian television series debuts
Television shows based on Indian novels
Dystopian television series
Hinduism in pop culture-related controversies
Works about totalitarianism
Indian television series distributed by Netflix